Side Effects of You is the fourth studio album by American recording artist Fantasia. The album was released in the United States on April 23, 2013, by RCA Records after the disbanding of J Records in 2011. The album features guest appearances from Big K.R.I.T., Kelly Rowland and Missy Elliott. In the summer of 2013, Barrino promoted the album with the Side Effects of You Tour.

Singles
The album's lead single, "Lose to Win", was released on January 8, 2013. On March 4, 2013, the music video for "Lose to Win" was released. On April 17, 2013, the album's second single, "Without Me" featuring Kelly Rowland and Missy Elliott was released. On July 1, 2013, the music video was released for "Without Me" featuring Kelly Rowland and Missy Elliott. On October 8, 2013, the album's third single, "Side Effects of You" was released.

Critical response

Side Effects of You received generally favorable reviews from music critics, who complimented its progression from Barrino's earlier works. Andy Kellman from AllMusic complimented her prominent role in its production and her choice in collaborators, adding that she "has released her finest album yet". Gerrick D. Kennedy from The Los Angeles Times praised the project as "sumptuous contemporary R&B dipped in vintage rock and soul".

Commercial performance
The album debuted at number two on the Billboard 200 chart, with first-week sales of 91,000 copies in the United States. The album has sold 300,000 copies in the United States as of May 2016.

Track listing

Charts

Weekly charts

Year-end charts

Release history

References

2013 albums
Fantasia Barrino albums
RCA Records albums
Albums produced by Naughty Boy
19 Recordings albums
Albums produced by Harmony Samuels